Nethaneel Joseph Mitchell-Blake (born 2 April 1994, London) is a British sprinter who specialises in the 200 metres. He was the 2013 European Junior Champion and his personal best of 19.95 seconds ranks him as the second-fastest in Britain of all-time in the event. He is only the second Briton, after Adam Gemili to break both 10 seconds for 100 metres and 20 seconds for 200 metres. Part of the Great Britain 4 x 100-metre relay team that won the World title in 2017, he won his first major individual honour, a silver medal, in the individual 200 metres at the 2018 European Athletics Championships before claiming another relay title running for Great Britain, the eventual gold medalists, in the heats of the 4 x 100 metres.On 18 February 2022 it was announced that Nethaneel and his teammates CJ Ujah, Zharnel Hughes and Richard Kilty would be stripped of their 4 × 100 metres relay 2020 Summer Olympics silver medals after the Court of Arbitration for Sport found CJ Ujah guilty of a doping violation.

Career
Born to Joseph Blake and Audrey Mitchell-Blake in Newham, London, his family relocated to Jamaica when he was age thirteen. Having already competed extensively as a child in the UK, his talent for sprinting was recognised by Jamaica College, who took him on, and he competed at the Inter-Secondary Schools Boys and Girls Championships. After a 200 m win at the 2011 Jamaican junior championships in a personal best of 21.54 seconds, he was selected to compete for Great Britain at the 2011 World Youth Championships in Athletics and finished fifth in his semi-final.

Mitchell-Blake was recruited by Louisiana State University and began to compete for them collegiately with the LSU Tigers team. In his first year in 2013 he was a 200 m semi-finalist at the NCAA Outdoor Championships and took fourth in the 4 × 100 metres relay there. In the relay he had top three finishes in the Southeastern Conference in both the 4 × 100 metres relay and 4 × 400 metres relay. He represented Great Britain at the 2013 European Athletics Junior Championships and was the 200 m champion, having set a best of 20.62 seconds. He also helped his country to fifth in the relay.

In his second year at Louisiana he failed to improve after an injury-affected indoor season, having a best of 20.69 seconds. He was again a semi-finalist at the 2014 NCAA Outdoor Championships, though he claimed his first top three finish there with LSU in the 4 × 100 metres relay.

Upon his return to competition in 2016, he set new bests. In the 60 metres he ran 6.65 seconds and in the indoor 200 m he completed the distance in 20.57 seconds. At the Southeastern Conference (SEC) indoor championships he won the 200 m after another best of 20.51 and also placed seventh in the 60 m. He entered the longer event at the 2016 NCAA Division I Indoor Track and Field Championships and finished as runner-up. In the outdoor season, he ran 10.09 seconds for the 100 metres in April, putting him at the top of the seasonal British rankings. He marked a breakthrough at the SEC Outdoor Championships, coming within one hundredth of the British record for the 200 m with his winning time of 19.95 seconds. He completed a regional triple by taking the 100 m individual and relay events, too.

Mitchell-Blake anchored the men's 4 x 100m relay team to a gold medal at the 2017 World Championships in Athletics. He ran the same leg at the 2019 World Athletics Championships, with the team finishing in silver medal position with a new European record of 37.36 seconds.

International competitions

References

External links

Living people
1995 births
People from the London Borough of Newham
Athletes from London
British male sprinters
English male sprinters
Olympic male sprinters
Olympic athletes of Great Britain
Athletes (track and field) at the 2016 Summer Olympics
World Athletics Championships athletes for Great Britain
World Athletics Championships winners
European Athletics Championships winners
British Athletics Championships winners
Louisiana State University alumni
LSU Tigers track and field athletes
English expatriates in Jamaica
English expatriates in the United States
Black British sportspeople
Athletes (track and field) at the 2020 Summer Olympics
Medalists at the 2020 Summer Olympics
Olympic silver medallists for Great Britain
Olympic silver medalists in athletics (track and field)
Competitors stripped of Summer Olympics medals
Athletes (track and field) at the 2022 Commonwealth Games
Commonwealth Games gold medallists for England
Commonwealth Games medallists in athletics
Medallists at the 2022 Commonwealth Games